In college football, 2017 NCAA football bowl games may refer to:

2016–17 NCAA football bowl games, for games played in January 2017 as part of the 2016 season.
2017–18 NCAA football bowl games, for games played in December 2017 as part of the 2017 season.